The College of Engineering at Ewha Womans University is one of its eleven major academic divisions (or colleges). Established in 1996, it has four departments: Computer Science, Electronics Engineering, Environmental Science, and Architecture. The college currently offers B.S., M.S., and Ph.D. degrees.

History
The college of engineering at Ewha Womans University was established in 1996 as the world’s first women’s college of engineering. Approximately 1,100 undergraduate and 120 graduate students have been studying at the college under the three divisions — Division of Computer & Electronics Engineering, Division of Architecture, and Division of Environmental & Food Science.

 1980s
 - 1981: The Department of Computer Science founded in the College of Liberal Arts and Sciences
1990s
 - 1993: The Department of Environmental Science founded in the College of Natural Science
 - 1994: The Department of Electronics Engineering and the Department of Architecture founded in the College of Natural Science
 - 1996: Dean KiHo Lee takes office (first dean)
 - 1996: The College of Engineering founded. The four departments, Computer Science, Electronics Engineering, Environmental Science, and Architecture transferred to the College of Engineering
 - 1996: The Department of Environmental Science renamed as the Department of Environmental Science & Engineering
 - 1997: Dean Yoon-Kyoo Jhee takes office (second dean)
 - 1998: The Department of Computer Science renamed as the Department of Computer Science & Engineering
 - 1999: Dean Yeoung-Soo Shin takes office (third dean)
 - 1999: The College of Engineering organized into 2 divisions: Computer Science & Electronics Engineering, and Architecture & Environmental System Engineering.
2000s
 - 2000: The Department of Electronics Engineering renamed as the Department of Information Electronics Engineering. The Department of Environmental Science & Engineering renamed as Environmental Science & Engineering Major School
 - 2000: System reorganized
 - 2001: Dean Seung Soo Park takes office (fourth dean)
 - 2003: Dean Yeoung-Soo Shin takes office (fifth dean)
 - 2005: Dean Yeoung-Soo Shin takes office (sixth dean)
 - 2006: School system reorganized.
 - 2006: The College of Engineering organized into three divisions: Computer Information Communication, Architecture, and Environmental & Food Technology
 - 2006: The Department of Computer Science & Engineering and the Department of Information Electronics Engineering integrated into the Department of Computer Information Communication Engineering
 - 2006: The Department of Architecture divided into Architecture Design Major and Architectural Engineering Major
 - 2006: The Department of Environmental Science & Engineering and the Department of Food Sciences & Technology reorganized into the Division of Environmental and Food Technology
 - 2006: Introduced the Accreditation Program for Engineering Education
 - 2007: Dean Myoung-Hee Kim takes office (seventh dean)
 - 2007: The Division of Computer Information Communication Engineering renamed as the Division of Information Communication Engineering, and divided into Computer Science & Engineering Major and Information Electronics Major
 - 2008: The Division of Information Communication Engineering renamed as the Division of Computer Information Communication
 - 2008: Computer Science & Engineering Major renamed as Computer Engineering Major
 - 2008: Information Electronics Major renamed as Electronics Engineering Major
 - 2009: Dean Sang-Ho Lee takes office (eighth dean)
 - 2011: Dean Kwang-Ok Kim takes office (ninth dean)

Academics

Division of Computer and Electronics Engineering

Department of Computer Science and Engineering

Division of Architecture
The Division of Architecture was founded in 1994 in the College of Natural Sciences as the Department of Architecture. Architecture covers up-to-date design environment from museum to skyscraper to daily surrounding environment, as well as all surrounding facilities including houses, museums, concert halls, schools, and offices. Until 2005, the Department of Architecture was part of the College of Engineering, and since 2006, it expanded to the Division of Architecture as an independent division. The division consists of 2 majors, Architecture Major and Architectural Engineering Major. In the Architecture Major, students study design and planning, and in the Architectural Engineering Major, students study core engineering technology and basic engineering knowledge, which includes structural engineering, environmental technology and construction management.

Department of Architecture
The curriculum consists of five areas: 
 Architectural Design: the center of the entire course of study
 Communication using Various Media
 Cultural Context including art, history, environment, and cities
 Practical Affairs such as building codes and ethics
 Technologies: engineering knowledge.

Department of Architectural Engineering
The Department of Architectural Engineering operates a 4-year engineering education accreditation program, dividing the subject into the following areas: 
 Building Structure: designing structures to secure the safety of buildings, sustainability of structures, green technology of structures, retrofitting of structural members, fire safety design of structures
 Bio-mechanical Engineering;safety evaluation of heart valves, fatigue analysis of bio-composites
 Building Environment Planning and Energy Efficient Building M/E system: realizing sustainable development and energy-saving, low-carbon green buildings
 Building Performance Simulation: simulation validation and testing, and simulation to support commissioning, controls and monitoring
 Governmental Policy for Energy-Efficient Green Building: design guideline for building energy saving, green building certification and rating system, and building energy efficiency rating system
 Construction Management: financial and operational management of construction projects.
 Building Materials: understanding the physical and mechanical properties of concrete, stone, wood, glass, etc.

In the graduate program, various projects are actively underway in such areas as structure repair and reinforcement, structural damage prediction, fire-resistance technology, energy-saving buildings, insulation technology, radiant cooling/heating technology, and construction management technology.

Division of Environmental and Food Science
The Division of Environmental and Food Science consists of Department of Environmental Science & Engineering and Department of Food Science and Engineering. Environmental and Food Science is a field of study for the 21st century where human beings, nature and technology coexist. Protecting nature is deeply concerned with preserving life, thus studying the environment implies protecting life. Food science and engineering is applied science which requires traditional food technology and complex integration of advanced technology for future industry.

Department of Environmental Science and Engineering
The Department of Environmental Science & Engineering has performed environmental projects in 
 Environmental management
 Policies
 Information System Monitoring
 Environmental Impact Assessment
 Media Environment
 Low-carbon Green Growth

Department of Food Science and Engineering

Academic resources

Accreditation Board for Engineering Education of Korea
Accreditation in engineering education is a quality assurance program run by the Accreditation Board for Engineering Education of Korea. The College of Engineering introduced the accreditation program for engineering education in 2005, and established the Center for Innovation in Engineering Education in 2006. It acquired accreditation in engineering education in 2009 as a result of organizing and operating recipient-oriented and performance-driven in-depth courses to actively respond to the demand of the fast-changing society.

Research institutes
The College of Engineering at Ewha Womans University is conducting systemic and in-depth research at its various research institutes.
 Severe Storm Research Center: was established to minimize damage from meteorological disasters by improving the accuracy of weather forecasts
 Center for Climate/Environment Change Prediction Research: was established to help the government and industries develop strategies for responding to medium-to-long term climate change through the specific and accurate prediction of the climate-driven changes in environments and ecosystems
 Center for Computer Graphics and Virtual Reality: was established in 1999 to research and develop future core technologies based on computer graphics and virtual reality
 Environmental Research Institute: was established in 1971 to research and provide solutions to environmental problems caused by industrialization, urbanization, and population increase by putting together research personnel from within Ewha
 Embedded Software Research Center: has its focus on establishing the research base for the area of embedded software, closely related to industrial demand, and fostering professional women engineers specializing in this area.

Government-funded medium-to-large scale research projects
Currently, the College of Engineering is carrying out a variety of government-funded medium-to-large scale research projects. 
 The BK21 Project: comprising three core research teams, is an advanced-level human resource development project that provides 200 to 250 million KRW in research funds annually to young researchers in master, doctoral, or post-doctoral programs with aims of building a world-class graduate school for training excellent researchers.
 The NRL (National Research Laboratory) Project: aims to strengthen the research capabilities in the areas of core fundamental technologies that should be strategically fostered at the national level. As a participant of the project, two research laboratories in the Department of Environmental Science & Engineering are given 200 million won of research fund a year. Since being selected as an Engineering Research Center by the National Research Foundation in 2009, the Center for Climate/Environment Change Prediction Research is developing an integral prediction system considering the interaction among climate, environment, and ecosystem with domestic researchers in relevant fields. It has been granted approximately 1.2 billion won a year for research.
 The IT Original Technology Development Program: aims to develop computer-based animation technologies featuring virtual entertainment contents such as computer games and special effects for films. It has been and will be granted 1 billion won of research fund per year from 2008 to 2013.

Exchange students program
Ewha Womans University offers "International Exchange and Study Abroad Program" to exchange and visiting students. This program has been established for students who are interested in a wide range of studies including topics on Asia and Korea, and is open to undergraduate and graduate students from any accredited institution of higher education. Students have the option to study for one or two semesters at Ewha as a non-degree seeking student. All international students enrolled in our program may register in any of the courses offered by Ewha, either in English or Korean, depending on their language proficiency.

Location
The college of engineering is located inside the main campus of Ewha Womans University, Seoul, Korea.

References

Ewha Womans University